Luteococcus sediminum is a Gram-positive and strictly aerobic bacterium from the genus Luteococcus which has been isolated from deep subseafloor sediments from the South Pacific Gyre in the Pacific Ocean.

References 

Propionibacteriales
Bacteria described in 2014